The melodious babbler (Malacopteron palawanense) is a species of bird in the family Pellorneidae.
It is endemic to the Philippines.

Its natural habitat is subtropical or tropical moist lowland forest.
It is threatened by habitat loss.

References
Citations

Bibliography
Collar, N. J. & Robson, C. 2007. Family Timaliidae (Babblers)  pp. 70 – 291 in; del Hoyo, J., Elliott, A. & Christie, D.A. eds. Handbook of the Birds of the World, Vol. 12. Picathartes to Tits and Chickadees. Lynx Edicions, Barcelona.

Malacopteron
Birds of Palawan
Birds described in 1895
Taxa named by Johann Büttikofer
Taxonomy articles created by Polbot